Buswelu is an administrative ward in Ilemela District in Mwanza Region, Tanzania with a postcode number 33204. In 2016 the Tanzania National Bureau of Statistics report there were 18,363 people in the ward, from 22,897 in 2012.

Villages 
The ward has 11 villages.

 Bujingwa
 Buswelu A
 Buswelu B
 Buhyila
 Bulola A
 Bulola B
 Busenga
 Zembwela
 Bulola Mlimani
 Majengo Mapya
 Kigala

References

Wards of Mwanza Region
Ilemela District
Constituencies of Tanzania